Camillus Archibong Etokudoh (born 1949), is a bishop of the Roman Catholic Church. He is the third
Bishop of Port Harcourt, appointed by
Pope Benedict XVI on 4 May 2009, to oversee the Diocese of Port Harcourt.

Biography
Born in Ikot Uko Etor in Essien Udim local government area of Akwa Ibom State, Archibong was ordained a priest on 2 July 1978. He has served as Titular Bishop of Capra (1988–1989), Auxiliary Bishop of Ikot Ekpene (1988–1989) and Bishop of Ikot Ekpene (1989–2009).

See also
List of Roman Catholic churches in Port Harcourt

References

External links

 Diocese of Port Harcourt
 Diocese of Ikot Ekpene

1949 births
Living people
Roman Catholic bishops of Port Harcourt
People from Akwa Ibom State
21st-century Roman Catholic titular bishops
20th-century Roman Catholic bishops in Nigeria
21st-century Roman Catholic bishops in Nigeria
Roman Catholic bishops of Ikot Ekpene